Gąsiorów may refer to the following places:
Gąsiorów, Jarocin County in Greater Poland Voivodeship (west-central Poland)
Gąsiorów, Koło County in Greater Poland Voivodeship (west-central Poland)
Gąsiorów, Łódź Voivodeship (central Poland)